San Julián (Saint Julian) may refer to:

San Julián, Sonsonate, El Salvador
San Julián, Jalisco, Mexico
San Julian, Eastern Samar, Philippines
Puerto San Julián, Patagonia, Santa Cruz Province (Argentina)
San Julián, Santa Cruz, Bolivia
San Julián (Chile), Chile
San Julián (mountain), a mountain in the Andes of Peru.
San Julián, an air base in Cuba.
Las Ventas de San Julián, municipality located in the province of Toledo